Novo Tepanje is a settlement in the Municipality of Slovenske Konjice in eastern Slovenia. It lies on the regional road from Slovenske Konjice to Slovenska Bistrica on the left bank of Oplotnica Creek, a left tributary of the Dravinja River. The area is part of the traditional region of Styria. The municipality is now included in the Savinja Statistical Region.

Mass graves
Novo Tepanje is the site of two known mass graves from the end of the Second World War and later. The grave contains the remains of Gottschee Germans and Slovene civilians from Slovenske Konjice that were murdered at the end of the war and after the war. The Mirnik Woods 2 Mass Grave is located southeast of the first grave,  from the edge of the woods below a dead oak tree with peeling bark. It contains the remains of victims (probably Gottschee Germans) that were murdered in May 1945.

References

External links
Novo Tepanje at Geopedia

Populated places in the Municipality of Slovenske Konjice